{{Infobox media franchise
| title = Hit-Girl & Kick-Ass
| image = Hit-Girl & Kick-Ass. logo.png
| caption = Hit-Girl logo as used in the solo series (top) and the Kick-Ass logo (bottom)
| creator = 
| origin = The Dave Lizewski Years (2008–14)
| owner = 
| comics = {{Plainlist|
Kick-Ass series 
 
}}
{{Plainlist|Hit-Girl series 
 
}}

| films = 
| books = See the Literature section
| tv = 
| games = See the Merchandise section
| vgs = See the Video games section
| soundtracks = 
}}Hit-Girl & Kick-Ass is a media franchise based on the adventures of superheroes of the same name. It began in 2008 with the Marvel comic Kick-Ass: The Dave Lizewski Years, with two stand-alone sequel series, Kick-Ass: The New Girl and Hit-Girl, following in 2018, and a crossover series, Kick-Ass vs. Hit-Girl, following in 2020. The comic series were created by Mark Millar and John Romita Jr. Hit-Girl is a young vigilante going around the world stopping crime in violent ways, while Kick-Ass has had several people taking on the mantle trying to save the day.

Kick-Ass, co-written and directed by Matthew Vaughn and also co-written by Jane Goldman, was released in March 2010. The film stars Aaron Taylor-Johnson and Chloë Grace Moretz. A sequel to this film, Kick-Ass 2, was released in August 2013. An untitled third Kick-Ass film and a spin-off prequel film Hit-Girl are in development. Adaptations of the films have been published, and numerous Kick-Ass video games have been released since 2010.

Comic series

Kick-Ass: The Dave Lizewski Years (2008-2014)

The Kick-Ass franchise began in 2008 with Book One of The Dave Lizewski Years, originally published as Kick-Ass. Books Two, Three, and Four, originally respectively published as Hit-Girl, Kick-Ass 2: Balls to the Wall and Kick-Ass 3, followed 2010–2014. The original series was rebranded as The Dave Lizewski Years following the release of stand-alone sequel series The New Girl and Hit-Girl in 2018. The series was created by Mark Millar and John Romita Jr. It is set in Mark Millar's shared universe, the "Millarverse"; as an example of this, Book Four of The Dave Lizewski Years makes reference to the events of Wanted, Nemesis, Kingsman, Superior and MPH, with Jupiter's Legacy and Supercrooks existing as fictional film within the series.

Kick-Ass: The New Girl (2018-present)

As of February 14, 2018, a new Kick-Ass series from Image Comics, titled Kick-Ass: The New Girl, went into publication, featuring an adult female protagonist named Patience Lee, an Afghanistan war veteran and single mother who dons the Kick-Ass costume and mantle to clear her family's financial debts by initially robbing high-profile criminals, eventually becoming a crime boss and taking over the former crime bosses' territories.

Hit-Girl (2018-present)

On February 21, 2018, the first issue of a Hit-Girl series from Image Comics was published, with a successive change of writers and artists for each story arc; Frank Quitely, Eduardo Risso, Rafael Albuquerque, Kevin Smith, Daniel Way and Pete Milligan named as the authors involved for each arc. The title sees Mindy McCready leaving America to carry on her fight for justice on a worldwide scale, depicting events mentioned in the epilogue of Book Four of The Dave Lizewski Years, serving as a sequel to the main events of the series.

Kick-Ass vs. Hit-Girl (2020–21)
Kick-Ass vs. Hit-Girl, a five-issue series depicting the first confrontation between Hit-Girl and Patience Lee, went into publication on November 11, 2020, set between the fourth and fifth volumes of Kick-Ass: The New Girl and the sixth and seventh volumes of Hit-Girl.

Crossover (2020–present)

An adult Hit-Girl first appears in the sixth issue of the Image Comics crossover series Crossover after being dragged into another reality by "The Event", partaking in an endless battle between residents of the Marvel, DC, and Image Universes (amongst characters from many other properties by Image Comics, Dark Horse Comics, Skybound Entertainment and Boom! Studios, including The Wicked + The Divine and I Hate Fairyland), saving Otto and Ellie before jumping into another battle.

Film series

Kick-Ass (2010)

The first film, Kick-Ass (2010), is set over the course of two years. Using his love for comics as inspiration, teenager Dave Lizewski (Aaron Johnson) decides to reinvent himself as a superhero—despite a complete lack of special powers. Dave dons a costume, dubs himself "Kick-Ass," and gets to work fighting crime. He joins forces with the father/daughter vigilante team of Big Daddy and Hit Girl, then befriends another fledgling crime-fighter called Red Mist (Christopher Mintz-Plasse), but a scheming mobster soon puts their alliance to the test.

The rights to a film version of Kick-Ass were sold before the first issue of the comic book of the same name was initially published. Developed in parallel by Mark Millar and Matthew Vaughn, the film's script, developed by Vaughn and Jane Goldman, took a different story direction, to reach many of the same conclusions, described by Millar as a "chick flick", with Goldman doing "construction work" and the "interior designing" and Vaughn serving as the story's "architect". Vaughn said that, "We wrote the script and the comic at the same time so it was a very sort of collaborative, organic process. I met [Millar] at the premiere of Stardust. We got on really well. I knew who he was and what he had done but I didn't know him. He pitched me the idea. I said, 'That's great!' He then wrote a synopsis. I went, 'That's great, let's go do it now! You write the comic, I'll write the script. In April 2010, Aaron Taylor-Johnson (as Aaron Johnson), Chloë Grace Moretz and Christopher Mintz-Plasse were announced to have been respectively cast as Kick-Ass, Hit-Girl and Red Mist, having been cast in 2008; Mintz-Plasse said of the creators of the film that in the lead-up to the film's release they were wondering whether a distributor would pick up the movie. On the set Vaughn jokingly referred to Kick-Ass as something that was going to be "the most expensive home movie I ever made". Due to the subsequent popularity of the Kick-Ass film, elements of the film were incorporated into the series in Books Two and Three of The Dave Lizewski Years, with Marcus Williams, created for the film, introduced as Hit-Girl's step-father, and the relationship between Katie and Lizewski, and Kick-Ass and Red Mist being much calmer, as Millar had aligned the characters with their movie counterparts, explained in-universe as both characters having overhauled their sense of self following separate pilgrimage.

Filming locations during the principal photography stage of development included Hamilton, Ontario, Canada; Dip 'N' Sip Donuts on Kingston Road in Toronto, Sir Winston Churchill Secondary School, and "many Toronto landmarks that play cameos"; and various locations in the United Kingdom, including Elstree Studios.

Kick-Ass 2 (2013)

The second film, Kick-Ass 2 (2013) is set over the course of one year. Adapting Books Two and Three of The Dave Lizewski Years, the film follows Dave (Aaron Taylor-Johnson), aka Kick-Ass, and Mindy (Chloë Grace Moretz), aka Hit Girl, are trying to live as normal teenagers and briefly form a crime-fighting team. After Mindy is busted and forced to retire as Hit Girl, Dave joins a group of amateur superheroes led by Col. Stars and Stripes (Jim Carrey), a reformed mobster. Just as Dave and company start to make a real difference on the streets, the villain formerly known as Red Mist (Christopher Mintz-Plasse) rears his head yet again.

Near the release of Kick-Ass, Mark Millar and Matthew Vaughn stated that a sequel would be possible if the first film was to perform well at the box office, and Vaughn expressed interest in directing the sequel. On May 8, 2012, it was reported that a sequel would be distributed by Universal Studios, and that Matthew Vaughn, at the time occupied with directing Kingsman: The Secret Service, had chosen Jeff Wadlow, who also wrote the script, to direct the sequel, titled Kick-Ass 2. Later that month, Aaron Taylor-Johnson and Chloë Grace Moretz entered negotiations to reprise their roles as Kick-Ass and Hit-Girl, respectively. Chad Gomez Creasey and Dara Resnik Creasey performed uncredited work on Wadlow's script to make Hit-Girl more feminine and less crass in light of Moretz's older age. In July 2012, Christopher Mintz-Plasse confirmed that he would return as Chris D'Amico who becomes the supervillain The Motherfucker. Mintz-Plasse expressed relief that scenes depicting sexual assault from the comic book would not be included in the film and went on to compare the gang violence in the story to the film The Warriors. That same month, it was announced that John Leguizamo would play a character named Javier, one of The Motherfucker's bodyguards. In August 2012, it was reported that Donald Faison would play the superhero Doctor Gravity. Also that month, Yancy Butler was set to reprise her role as Angie D'Amico, Lyndsy Fonseca stated that she would return as Katie Deauxma in a smaller role, Robert Emms was cast as the former police officer turned superhero Insect Man, Morris Chestnut was confirmed to replace Omari Hardwick as Hit-Girl's guardian Marcus Williams, Lindy Booth was confirmed to play Night Bitch, a superhero seeking to avenge the murder of her sister, Andy Nyman was announced to play one of the villains named The Tumor, and Claudia Lee joined the cast as Brooke, the leader of a gang of school bullies.

In September 2012, Jim Carrey was cast in the role of Colonel Stars and Stripes, former gangster, born again Christian, and leader of superhero group Justice Forever. Also in September, Enzo Cilenti was confirmed to appear in the film. It was confirmed that bodybuilder Olga Kurkulina would portray the villainess Mother Russia. It was revealed that Clark Duke would reprise his role as Marty Eisenberg, who becomes the superhero Battle Guy, and that Augustus Prew would take over the role of Todd Haynes, who becomes the superhero Ass-Kicker, from Evan Peters. Principal photography began on September 7, 2012 in Mississauga, Ontario, Canada. Once filming in Mississauga wrapped in late September, the cast and crew continued shooting in London, England, at Ashmole Academy. Filming concluded on November 23, 2012.

Future
In April 2012, while Kick-Ass 2 was still in pre-production, Mark Millar stated that a third film was also planned. In June 2013, however, he revealed that it was not confirmed and would be dependent on how successful the second film was. Later the same month he further elaborated that if it went ahead, the third film would be the final installment: "Kick-Ass 3 is going to be the last one... I told Universal this and they asked me, ‘What does that mean?’ I said, ‘It means that this is where it all ends.’ They said, ‘Do they all die at the end?’ I said, ‘Maybe’ – because this is a realistic superhero story... if someone doesn't have a bullet proof vest like Superman, and doesn't have Batman's millions, then eventually he is going to turn around the wrong corner and get his head kicked in or get shot in the face. So Kick-Ass needs to reflect that. There has to be something dramatic at the end; he cannot do this for the rest of his life."

Moretz has shown interest in returning for a third installment and would also be interested in exploring Hit-Girl's dark side: "I want to see something we haven't seen yet. Now we've seen who Mindy is, now we've seen who Hit-Girl is, I think we need to meld the characters together and have Mindy become Hit-Girl and Hit-Girl become Mindy. Maybe her natural hair has a streak of purple in it, maybe she really does go kind of crazy and go a bit darker since she lost her father." She also added, "I would only do the third one if it was logical. It needs to be a good script and a director, probably Matthew (Vaughn). The third film needs to fully wrap up the series and has to be a good note to end on."

On August 30, 2013, Millar stated that the film is "in the pipeline". In May 2014, while at a press junket for Godzilla, Taylor-Johnson stated he is still up for a third film but he is not contracted for it and there are no plans for one currently. In the same month, Christopher Mintz-Plasse revealed he had not heard anything but expressed doubt that a third film would happen due to the second installment's disappointing box office performance.

In June 2014, Chloë Grace Moretz echoed her co-stars' sentiments when asked about Kick-Ass 3, stating that "I hope, I wish. That'd be fun. That'd be great. I doubt it but I would love it". She also cited the second film's lower box office gross as the key obstacle to the third chapter being produced and suggested file sharing was a factor: "The hard thing is if fans want a third movie, they’ve got to go buy the ticket to go see the movie. It was like the second most pirated movie of the year, so if you want a movie to be made into a second, a third, a fourth and a fifth, go buy a ticket. Don't pirate it." In August 2014, Moretz reiterated her previous statements and said "sadly, I think I'm done with [Hit-Girl]".

In February 2015, Matthew Vaughn, who directed the first Kick-Ass film, spoke optimistically about a Hit-Girl prequel, stating "If that happens, I’m pretty sure I can persuade Aaron and Chloe to come back and finish the story of Kick-Ass." On June 17, 2015, Vaughn stated in an answer to Yahoo that he is working on a prequel on how Hit-Girl and Big Daddy became superheroes and plans to make Kick-Ass 3 after. In June 2018, in an interview with Empire, Vaughn confirmed the film to still be in development, in addition expressing interest in a sequel film with Chloë Grace Moretz reprising her role, and a crossover film with the Kingsman franchise.

In January 2018, Mark Millar said that he'd like to see Tessa Thompson portray the Patience Lee incarnation of the character in a prospective third Kick-Ass film, Thompson stating that she was "highly interested" in the role. In June 2018, Matthew Vaughn announced his intention to set up Marv Studios, under which banner he will produce Kick-Ass 3, followed by a reboot of the Hit-Girl & Kick-Ass series.

On 16 December 2021, Vaughn revealed to Collider that a reboot in the works and will be out in two years.

Cast and crew

Main cast 

 This table shows the recurring characters and the actors who have portrayed them throughout the franchise.
 A dark grey cell indicates the character was not in the film, or that the character's presence in the film has not yet been announced.
 A  indicates an appearance in (a) scene(s) not included in the theatrical version of the film.
 A  indicates an appearance as a younger version of a pre-existing character.
 A  indicates a cameo appearance.
 A  indicates a voice-only role.
 An  indicates an appearance through archival footage or audio.

Crew

Music

Reception

Box office performance

Critical and public response

Video games

In April 2010, it was confirmed that Kick-Ass would have a tie-in game to accompany its release, and that it would be a beat 'em up combat video game, released on iOS and PlayStation Network (PSN) developed and published by Frozen Codebase (published by WHA Entertainment for the PSN version). The iOS version of the game was released on April 17, 2010, but had since been pulled from the Apple App Market. The PlayStation Network version of the game was released on April 29, 2010 in North America and May 5, 2010 in Europe. On August 14, 2014, Freedom Factory Studios released a beat 'em up sequel, Kick-Ass 2: The Game, based on the movie Kick-Ass 2.

Marketing
Funko released Pop! Wacky Wobbler bobblehead figures of Kick-Ass, Hit-Girl and Red Mist in 2011.

Notes

References

External links

 
 The Secret Service (Volume) - Comic Vine
 MDP:Secret Service—Marvel Database

Mass media franchises introduced in 2008
Action film franchises
American film series
Fictional intelligence agencies
Film series introduced in 2010
Spy film series